First Work is the debut EP release by Australia rock band Thirsty Merc released in 2003, which appeared on the ARIA Charts top 100. It features early versions of songs that the band re-recorded for their studio album Thirsty Merc.

Track listing
All songs written by Rai Thistlethwayte.
 "Wasting Time" – 3:55
 "Emancipate Myself" – 3:44
 "Baby Tell Me I'm the Only One" – 3:23
 "Homewrecker" – 3:05
 "Skeletal Wreck" – 1:45

Personnel
Rai Thistlethwayte – guitars, pianos and singer-songwriter
Phil Stack – bass guitar and backing vocals
Karl Robertson – drums and percussion
Matt Baker – guitars and backing vocals

Charts

References 

2003 debut EPs
Thirsty Merc albums